The 2016 season was T–Team's 5th season in Liga Super since being promoted.

Squad

First-team squad

Transfers

1st leg

In:

Out:

2nd leg

Out:

Competitions

Liga Super

League table

References

Terengganu F.C. II
Malaysian football clubs 2016 season